Parotocinclus jimi is a species of catfish in the family Loricariidae. It is native to South America, where it is known from the state of Bahia in Brazil. The species reaches 4 cm (1.6 inches) SL.

References 

Fish described in 1977
Fish of South America
Otothyrinae